Nizhnekargino (Tübänge Qarğawıl) is a rural locality (a selo) in Asyanovsky Selsoviet, Dyurtyulinsky District, Bashkortostan, Russia. The population was 188 as of 2010. There are 3 streets.

Geography 
Nizhnekargino is located 19 km southwest of Dyurtyuli (the district's administrative centre) by road. Verkhnekargino is the nearest rural locality.

References 

Rural localities in Dyurtyulinsky District